Master of the Game is the fourteenth studio album by American keyboardist and record producer George Duke. It was released in 1979 through Epic Records. Recording sessions for this full-length album took place at Westlake Recording Studios in Los Angeles. The album features contributions from vocalists Lynn Davis, Josie James and Napoleon Murphy Brock, guitarists David Myles, Ray Obiedo and Roland Bautista, bassists Byron Miller and Freddie Washington, drummer Ricky Lawson, percussionist Sheila Escovedo, trombonist Bill Reichenbach, trumpeters Jerry Hey and Gary Grant, and saxophonist Gary Herbig.

Background
In creating of Master of the Game, Duke used a variety of keyboard instruments viz. Fender Rhodes electric piano, Yamaha Acoustic piano, Yamaha Electric grand piano, Wurlitzer electric piano, Hohner Clavinet D6, ARP Odyssey and ARP String Ensemble synthesizers, Minimoog, Oberheim synthesizer, Sequential Circuits Prophet-5 and Crumar synthesizer. David Myles played six and twelve-string acoustic guitars, electric guitar and sitar. The album was mastered by Brian Gardner at Allen Zent Studio in Los Angeles.

Release
The album peaked at number 125 on the US Billboard 200 album chart and at number 18 on the Top R&B/Hip-Hop Albums chart. Master of the Game spawned two singles: "I Want You for Myself" and "Every Little Step I Take". Its lead single, "I Want You for Myself" featuring Lynn Davis, reached number 23 on both the Hot R&B/Hip-Hop Songs and the Dance Club Songs charts.

The opening of the track "Look What You Find" was used as the theme music for Connecticut Public Television's identification logo in the 1980s. 

The track "I Love You More" would later be sampled years later by Daft Punk, for their hit single "Digital Love".

Track listing

Personnel 
 George Duke – vocals, acoustic piano, electric pianos, clavinet, organ, synthesizers, bells
 David Myles – acoustic guitar, electric guitar, 12-string acoustic guitar, sitar
 Ray Obiedo – guitar (3)
 Roland Bautista – guitar (8)
 Byron Lee Miller – bass (1, 2, 4-9)
 "Ready" Freddie Washington – bass (3)
 Ricky Lawson – drums (1, 2, 4-9)
 Sheila Escovedo – drums (3), percussion
 Gary Herbig – alto saxophone, tenor saxophone, piccolo flute
 Bill Reichenbach Jr. – trombone, bass trombone
 Jerry Hey – trumpet, flugelhorn
 Gary Grant – trumpet (7)
 Napoleon Murphy Brock – vocals
 Lynn Davis – vocals, lead vocals (4)
 Josie James – vocals

Production 
 George Duke – producer, arrangements
 Tommy Vicari – engineer
 Dave Rideau – tracking (3)
 Kerry McNabb – tracking (8)
 Erik Zobler – assistant engineer
 Mitch Gibson – assistant engineer
 Brian Gardner – mastering
 David Fisher – cover artwork

Chart history

References

External links 

George Duke's 1970s discography on his website
Master of the Game by George Duke on iTunes

1979 albums
George Duke albums
Epic Records albums
Albums produced by George Duke